was a junction at Toyokawa, Aichi, Japan,
In 1963, the junction was merged to Kozakai Station. But the function and the name still remain.

Lines
 Central Japan Railway Company (JR Central)
 Iida Line
 Nagoya Railroad
 Nagoya Main Line

Two single tracks exist between this junction and Toyohashi Station. The eastern one (in the diagram above) is the Meitetsu Nagoya Main Line and the western one is the Iida Line. They are combined and used as a double track.

There are two JR stations (Shimoji Station and Funamachi Station) on this section of Iida line. Meitetsu trains do not stop at these stations.

History
 1 April 1926: Higashi-Okazaki - Kozakai open as Toyohashi Line
 1 June 1927: Hirai Junction opened (Ina Junction - Toyohashi open )
 1 August 1943: The  was nationalized and the junction was renamed Hirai shingōjō.
 17 December 1963: Merged with Kozakai Station.

Iida Line